The siege of Myitkyina was an engagement during the Burma campaign of World War II.  The Allied victory was part of the larger Battle of Northern Burma and Western Yunnan which succeeded in opening the Ledo Road.

Background
Joseph Stilwell intended to make a rapid march against Myitkyina prophesying it to be a "feat which will live in military history", wanting the town for the nearby airstrip, strategically vital to the campaign as it would be an invaluable source of supplies and aerial support in the notoriously difficult jungle fighting in the China-Burma-India theater. Chinese Expeditionary Force commander Wei Lihuang also played a fundamental role in striking the Imperial Japanese Army. Sun li-Jen, as the second commander of the new Chinese 1st Army,  one of the best of the Chinese National Revolutionary Army. The 1st Army has since changed their equipment from old, unsuitable-for-combat caps into US-supplied M1 helmets, and had exchanged their bolt-action Type Zhongzheng rifles for newer American and British weaponry. In addition to that, the Chinese Expeditionary Force (CEF) had finally received artillery and air support from the US and British forces as well, giving them a distinct advantage against the now-malnourished, low-morale Japanese forces around Myitkyina. The US and British played a relatively minor role during the battle, although they also had combat units, such as the famed 'Merrill's Marauders', active in the fighting.

Siege
Stilwell gave the Chinese 22nd Division orders to advance against the bridges held by the Japanese on March 15. After two months of fighting, Myitkyina was now in reach. With the arrival of the rainy season, the incessant rain didn't stop until May 17. On that day, at 10:00 p.m., the Chinese Expeditionary Force launched an attack with the U.S. Army's 'Merrill's Marauders' unit against the Japanese airstrip at Myitkyina, supported by artillery. Eight Japanese planes were quickly destroyed as the battle escalated. The Japanese were caught by surprise, and, not knowing where their enemies were, poured gasoline onto the airfield in an attempt to disable it and retreated into Myitkyina proper, intending to fight the Chinese and Americans on more favorable terms there. The Chinese and the Americans quickly overran the field relatively intact, whereupon U.S. Army Air Forces  and Royal Air Force C-47 transport aircraft moved the Chinese 89th Regiment of the 30th Division to the battlefield to supplement the exhausted C.E.F. and Marauder units already at Myitkyina.

Afterward, some Chinese units attacked the town itself, but the attack was soon called off when two Chinese battalions, in the confusion and excitement of the battle, mistakenly engaged each other in a fierce firefight, and when two other battalions were moved in, they too repeated the mistake.

A stalemate ensued throughout June, but the capture of Mogaung by the British Chindits under Mike Calvert later that month was the beginning of the end for the Japanese garrison at Myitkyina. With supply lines cut, infighting grew between the two local Japanese commanders over their orders regarding the defence of the town. Stillwell had demanded that the Chindits join them but they were whittled down by disease and combat. Stillwell nevertheless was reinforced by the arrival of elements of Francis Festing's 36th Division from 15 July Myitkyina airfield. On hearing of the weakening Japanese garrison in Myitkyina, Stillwell sent that Division not to take Myitkyina but to advance on the 'Railway Corridor' from Mogaung towards Indaw on the right flank of NCAC.

On July 26, the American 3rd Battalion of the Marauders made a significant gain by capturing the northern air field at Myitkyina and over the next week Japanese resistance was noticeably weaker.

On August 3, General Genzo Mizukami ordered the town abandoned and took his life in a literal compliance to "defend Myitkyina to the death" as the Chinese and US forces gradually cleared the city and the surrounding area of Japanese troops.

Aftermath
The operations against Myitkyina was particularly hard on the Chinese Expeditionary Force, due to the hard fighting, lack of supplies, difficult terrain, and disease. Owing to excessive casualties, the unit effectively ceased to exist as a fighting force and was therefore disbanded. The long-awaited taking of Myitkyina and its airfield allowed for the opening of the Ledo Road, connecting the old Burma Road with China. The Chinese forces' casualties were the highest among all the battles during the Chinese-intervention of Burma Campaign.

Order of battle

References

External links
 Stilwell's Command Problems
 Final Victories

Military history of Burma during World War II